Eddie Lee Jackson (July 7, 1949 – December 18, 2020) was an American politician.

Career
Jackson served as a Democratic member of the Illinois House of Representatives, representing the 114th District from his appointment on January 9, 2009, to replace Wyvetter H. Younge to 2017. The district includes Alorton, Belleville, Brooklyn, Cahokia, Centreville, East St. Louis, Fairview Heights, Mascoutah, Millstadt, O'Fallon, Sauget, Scott Air Force Base, Shiloh, Swansea, and Washington Park.

He was a member of the Illinois House Legislative Black Caucus.

In the 96th General Assembly, Jackson was the vice-chairman of the Illinois House Consumer Protection Committee.

Death
Jackson died from COVID-19 in East St. Louis, on December 18, 2020, at the age of 71, during the COVID-19 pandemic in Illinois.

References

External links
 Representative Eddie Lee Jackson (D) 114th District at the Illinois General Assembly
 By session: 98th, 97th, 96th
 
 Eddie Lee Jackson  at Illinois House Democrats

1949 births
2020 deaths
Democratic Party members of the Illinois House of Representatives
African-American state legislators in Illinois
People from East St. Louis, Illinois
People from New Madrid County, Missouri
Southern Illinois University Edwardsville alumni
Deaths from the COVID-19 pandemic in Illinois
21st-century American politicians
21st-century African-American people